The Walter NZ 85 was a seven-cylinder, air-cooled, radial engine for aircraft use built in Czechoslovakia by Walter Aircraft Engines in the late-1920s.

Design and development
Using common cylinders and parts from the earlier Walter NZ 60 (Novák-Zeithammer) engine the NZ 85 and the nine-cylinder NZ 120 were designed together. Lightened and tuned developments were known as the NZ 90 and NZ 95.

Applications
 Aero A.34
 Avia BH-20
 Avia BH-29
 Breda Ba.15
 Couzinet 30 (intended application)
 Gribovsky G-8
 Hopfner HS-8/29
 IMAM Ro.5
 Letov Š-118
 Orta-Saint Hubert G.1
 Savoia-Marchetti S.56
 Shavrov Sh-1

Specifications (NZ 85)

See also

References

 Gunston, Bill. World Encyclopaedia of Aero Engines. Cambridge, England. Patrick Stephens Limited, 1989. 
 Němeček, Václav. Československá letadla I (1918-1945) (Czechoslovak Aircraft I (1918-1945)). Third edition, Naše vojsko, Prague. 1983.

NZ 85
1920s aircraft piston engines
Aircraft air-cooled radial piston engines